Mahmoud Zamani Qummi is an Iranian reform politician who served as governor of  Yazd Province from 2017 to 2018. Qummi served as governor of Chaharmahal and Bakhtiari Province from 2003 to 2005 and governor of Markazi Province from 2015 to 2017 .

References

Living people
People from Yazd Province
Year of birth missing (living people)
Governors of Yazd Province